The Longster Trail is a waymarked footpath in Cheshire, England. The route is shown on Ordnance Survey Explorer Maps 266 and 267.

History
The Longster Trail was devised in the 1970s but the path was first opened and properly waymarked during the 1980s. It was named after Frank Longster, a local man who served as chairman of the Mid-Cheshire Footpath Society during the 1970s until his death in 1974. The path is waymarked with two waymarks, both the older yellow arrow and red dot markers and the newer yellow arrow which encloses the words Longster Trail.

Sights
Many of the best sights along the Longster Trail are those seen from the summit of Helsby Hill. These include the cathedrals in Liverpool, Beeston Castle and the mountains of North Wales. Helsby Hill itself is viewable from most of the Longster Trail. The path also passes two public houses along its length, namely The White Horse in Great Barrow, and the Bird in Hand in Guilden Sutton. The end of the path is also very close to The Piper, a pub on the side of the A41 road, Chester.

See also
 List of recreational walks in Cheshire

References

External links
 The Long Distance Walkers Association - basic info on the Longster Trail

Footpaths in Cheshire